The 1985 Asian Judo Championships were held in Tokyo, Japan in March.

Medal overview

Women's events

Medals table

References
Judo Channel by Token Corporation
South Korea won three bronze medals

External links
Judo Union of Asia

Asian Judo Championships
Asian Championships
Asian Judo Championships
International sports competitions hosted by Japan
1985 in Tokyo
Sports competitions in Tokyo
Asian Championships 1985